Fokin, sometimes spelled Fokine, or Fokina (feminine) is a common Russian surname. It may refer to:
Anton Fokin (born 1982), Uzbek artistic gymnast
Igor Fokin (1960–1996), Russian puppeteer and street performer
Maksim Fokin (born 1982), Russian footballer
Michel Fokine (1880–1942), Russian choreographer and dancer
Sergei Fokin (footballer) (born 1961) Russian footballer
Sergei Fokin (ice hockey) (born 1963) Russian ice hockey player
Valery Fokin (born 1946), Russian theatrical director and writer

Vitaliy Alekseyevich Fokin (1906–1964), Russian admiral
Vitold Fokin (born 1932), Ukrainian deputy prime minister
Fokin Government, the Ukrainian government cabinet (1990–1991) under Vitold Fokin
Vladislav Fokin (ice hockey) (born 1986), Russian ice hockey player 
Yevgeni Fokin (1909–1972), Russian footballer
Yuriy Fokin (born 1966), Ukrainian footballer

Russian-language surnames